The Russian Professional Basketball Championship is the top-tier level men's professional club basketball competition in the country of Russia. Over the years, there have been 3 different incarnations of the Russian Basketball Championship. The Russian Super League 1, from the 1991–92 to 2009–10 seasons, the Russian Professional League (PBL), from the 2010–11 to 2011–13 seasons, and the VTB United League, from the 2013–14 season to the present. During the Soviet Union era, the USSR Premier League served as the national championship for Russian Soviet Federative Socialist Republic clubs.

History
From the 1991–92 to 2009–10 seasons, the winner of the Super League 1 was awarded the top-level Russian national championship. For three seasons, the PBL was Russia's highest tier, and in the 2013–14 season, the VTB United League, a regional league for Eastern Europe, was named the new top-level national domestic competition for Russian clubs.

Champions

Awards

Medals by club

See also
 Russian basketball league system
 VTB United League
 Russian Professional League
 Russian Super League 1
 USSR Premier League
 Russian Cup 
 USSR Cup

Basketball leagues in Russia
National championships in Russia